Sanele Magaqa is a South African politician and a member of the Eastern Cape Provincial Legislature for the Democratic Alliance (DA). He previously served as a DA councillor in the Buffalo City Metropolitan Municipality and the Amathole District Municipality.

Political career
Magaqa had served as a  Democratic Alliance councillor in the Amathole District Municipality. He was then elected as a DA councillor in the Buffalo City Metropolitan Municipality in 2011. In September 2015, he resigned from the Buffalo City Council and was sworn in as a member of the Eastern Cape Provincial Legislature for the DA. He was appointed as Shadow MEC for Human Settlements. Magaqa was elected to a full term in the provincial legislature in 2019.

Personal life
In April 2018, Magaqa was hijacked by seven armed men in King William's Town in the Eastern Cape.

In June 2021, Magaqa appeared in the Keiskammahoek Magistrate’s Court for allegedly assaulting a woman in Keiskammahoek back in December 2017.

References

External links

Sanele Magaqa at DA Bhisho

Living people
Xhosa people
Year of birth missing (living people)
Place of birth missing (living people)
People from the Eastern Cape
Members of the Eastern Cape Provincial Legislature
Democratic Alliance (South Africa) politicians